Route 184 is a state highway in New Jersey, United States. It is an old section of Route 440 that was rerouted. Route 184's western end is at an intersection with the Garden State Parkway in Woodbridge Township; its eastern end is at an intersection with Route 35 in Perth Amboy. The highway passes several local landmarks along the highway, but is less populated than the surrounding area. Except for the easternmost section between Route 35 and Route 440, the highway is concurrent with County Route 501, but is not county-maintained.

The route originated as Route S4, which became Route 440 on January 1, 1953. In 1974, a part of Route 440 was bypassed and rerouted, and the New Jersey State Highway Department reassigned the former alignment as Route 184.

Route description

Route 184 begins at an interchange with the Garden State Parkway's exit 129 and County Route 501 (CR 501) in Woodbridge Township. The route, immediately concurrent with CR 501 is known as King Georges Road, which turns to the north near Fords Park. Just after the split from King Georges Road, Route 184 enters a partial cloverleaf interchange with US 9 and passes south of Hopelawn Park. After passing the local cemetery, the route crosses a junction with CR 655 (Florida Grove Road). Continuing east, the route becomes known as Pfieffer Boulevard and crosses an interchange with Route 440 in Perth Amboy.

Just east of Route 440, the route continues northward until reaching an intersection with Route 35 (Convery Boulevard), marking the eastern terminus of Route 184.

History
Route 184 originated as a prefixed spur of Route 4 (currently an alignment of U.S. Route 9), New Jersey State Highway Route S-4, first defined in 1927. The highway was an alignment from the new Outerbridge Crossing to Route 4. It was eventually extended from Route 4 to the recently built Route 4 Parkway (now the Garden State Parkway) in 1951. In the 1953 renumbering on January 1, 1953, Route S-4 was decommissioned and renumbered to Route 440 to match up with New York State Route 440 in Staten Island.

Major intersections

See also

References

External links

Route 184 Photos
New Jersey Highway Ends - 184
Speed Limits for State Roads: Route 184

184
Transportation in Middlesex County, New Jersey